NDSS may refer to the following:

 Nanaimo District Secondary School in Nanaimo, British Columbia, Canada
 Napanee District Secondary School in Napanee, Ontario, Canada
 National Diabetes Services Scheme
 New Democratic Party of Serbia (Nova demokratska stranka Srbije), a political party in Serbia
 Niagara District Secondary School in Niagara-on-the-Lake, Ontario, Canada
 Niger Delta Science School in Port Harcourt, Nigeria
 North Delta Secondary School in Delta, British Columbia, Canada
 Norwell District Secondary School in Palmerston, Ontario, Canada
 National Down Syndrome Society, an organization based in Manhattan, New York City, New York, USA
 Niggaz Done Started Something song by rapper DMX featuring rap group The LOX and Mase from the album It's Dark and Hell Is Hot